Cris Robert Martínez Escobar (born April 24, 1993 in Paraguay), better known as Cris Martínez, is a Paraguayan naturalized Chilean footballer who currently plays for Huachipato as a forward.

Personal life
Martínez got the Chilean nationality by residence in January 2021.

Honours

Club
Nacional Asunción
Paraguayan Primera División: 2009 Clausura, 2011 Apertura

San Luis de Quillota
Primera B: Torneo Apertura 2013

Deportes Temuco
Primera B: Primera B de Chile 2015–16

Santos Laguna
 Liga MX: Clausura 2018

References

External links
 
 

1993 births
Living people
Sportspeople from Asunción
Paraguayan footballers
Paraguayan expatriate footballers
Paraguayan emigrants to Chile
Naturalized citizens of Chile
Chilean footballers
Paraguayan Primera División players
Club Nacional footballers
Primera B de Chile players
Chilean Primera División players
San Luis de Quillota footballers
Deportes Temuco footballers
C.D. Huachipato footballers
Peruvian Primera División players
Club Universitario de Deportes footballers
Liga MX players
Santos Laguna footballers
Paraguayan expatriate sportspeople in Chile

Paraguayan expatriate sportspeople in Peru
Paraguayan expatriate sportspeople in Mexico
Expatriate footballers in Chile
Expatriate footballers in Sweden
Expatriate footballers in Peru
Expatriate footballers in Mexico
Association football forwards